Copelatus silvestrii is a species of diving beetle. It is part of the subfamily Copelatinae in the family Dytiscidae. It was described by Régimbart in 1903.

References

silvestrii
Beetles described in 1903